The Balver Höhle (German for Balve Cave) is the biggest cave used as a cultural venue in Europe. It is located in Balve, Germany.

History

The Balve Cave was mentioned in the Thidrekssaga. It has been used by the local Schützenfest (marksmen's festival) each year for over 160 years.

Since 1985 it has also been the venue of an annual theatre festival, the Festspiele Balver Höhle. Its first play was the Katharina von Georgien directed by Hermann Wedekind.In 1991 it staged dramas based on fairy tales festival was installed by Festspiele Balver Höhle. In 1998 the Festspiele Balver Höhle performed their first oriental musical. In 2009 they did their second, "Der kleine Muck".

Semi-professionals and professionals are working together at Irish Folk & Celtic Music, Balver Märchenwochen and other activities of Festspiele Balver Höhle.

Festivals

Balver Märchenwochen, since 1991
Irish Folk & Celtic Music, since 2002
Höhlenrock, terminated 2004
International Jazzfestival, terminated 2005

Rehearsals
Christian Bollmann (until 1999)
Justus Frantz (1994–2007)
Mixery-Cave

Single events
Redentiner Osterspiel
Mal Sondock's Hitparade
Public Viewing
Tu es Petrus (1997)

Recordings
Live in der Balver Höhle (1980)
Klangräume (1996)
MTV Unplugged Fanta 4 (2000)

Literature

In German
Klaus Günther, Die altsteinzeitlichen Funde der Balver Höhle, Aschendorff Verlag, Münster 1964

See also 
 List of show caves in Germany

References

External links

Veranstaltungen in der Balver Höhle - Schützenbruderschaft St. Sebastian Balve 

Show caves in Germany
Balve
Westphalia culture
Landforms of North Rhine-Westphalia
Tourist attractions in North Rhine-Westphalia
Caves of Germany
Prehistoric cannibalism